The study of homosexuality in Mexico can be divided into three separate periods, coinciding with the three main periods of Mexican history: pre-Columbian, colonial, and post-independence, in spite of the fact that the rejection of homosexuality forms a connecting thread that crosses the three periods.

The data on the pre-Columbian people and those of the period of colonization is scarce and obscure.  Historians often described the indigenous customs that surprised them or that they disapproved of, but tended to take a position of accusation or apology, which makes it impossible to distinguish between reality and propaganda.  In general, it seems that the Mexica were as homophobic as the Spanish, and that other indigenous peoples tended to be much more tolerant, to the point of honoring Two-Spirit people as shamans.

The history of homosexuality in the colonial period and after independence is still in great part yet to be studied.  Above all, the 1658 executions of sodomites and the 1901 Dance of the Forty-One, two great scandals in Mexican public life, dominate the scene.

The situation is changing in the twenty-first century, in part thanks to the discovery of the LGBT community as potential consumers, the so-called pink peso, and tourists.  Laws have been created to combat discrimination (2003), and two federal entities, the Federal District and Coahuila, have legalized civil unions for same-sex couples (2007).  On 21 December 2009, despite opposition from the Church, the Government of Mexico City approved same-sex marriage, with 39 votes in favor, 20 against and 5 abstaining.  It was the first city in Latin America to do so.  However, in 2007 Mexico was still one of the countries in which the most crimes were committed against the LGBT community, with a person being murdered in a homophobic crime every two days.

Pre-Columbian Mexico
The majority of information on the pre-Columbian peoples comes from the reports of the Spanish conquest.  These accounts must be taken with caution, given that the accusation of sodomy was used to justify the conquest, along with other accusations real or invented, such as human sacrifice, cannibalism, or idolatry.  Given that the defenders of the natives manipulated the information to their opinion as much as those who were opposed by them, some trying to minimize the incidence of sodomy and others exaggerating the stories, it proves impossible to get an adequate picture of homosexuality in pre-Columbian Mexico.  The historian Antonio de Herrera arrived at that conclusion as early as 1601.

The Maya

The Maya were relatively tolerant of homosexuality.  It is known that there were orgies among the Maya that included homosexual sex, but for sodomy you would be condemned to death in a fiery furnace.

Mayan society considered homosexuality preferable to premarital heterosexual sex, so the nobles got sexual slaves for their children.

The Mexica
The Mexica or Aztecs were extremely intolerant of homosexuality, even though some of their public rituals had homoerotic overtones.  Thus, for example, they worshipped the goddess Xochiquétzal, who reduced her masculine appearance, with the name of Xochipilli, and protected male prostitution and homosexuality.  The mythical history of the Aztec people was divided into four "worlds", of which the previous had been "an easy, weak life, of sodomy, perversion, of the dance of the flowers and of adoration to Xochiquétzal", in which the "masculine virtues of war, management and wisdom" were forgotten.  It is possible that this story made reference to the Toltecs.  The author Richard Texler, in his book Sex and the Conquest, stated that the Aztecs converted some of the conquered enemies into sex slaves, following the metaphor that penetration is a sign of power.

Mexica law punished sodomy with the gallows, impalement for the active homosexual, extraction of the entrails through the anal orifice for the passive homosexual, and death by garrote for the lesbians.

Some authors state that these strict laws were not used in practice and that homosexuals were relatively free.  For example, they cite Spanish chronicles that speak of widespread sodomy that included children of up to 6 years or of children dressed like women to practice prostitution.  The chronicles also speak of religious acts in which sodomy was practiced.

The existence of lesbianism is testified to by the Nahuatl word "patlacheh", which designates a woman who carries out masculine activities, including the penetration of other women, as revealed in the General history of the matters of New Spain by Bernardino de Sahagún.

It needs to be noted that many codices written by the Mexica on this subject have been tampered with and/or destroyed by the Spanish .

Other indigenous peoples
In spite of the puritanism of the Mexica, the sexual customs of the people conquered by the Aztec Empire varied to a great extent.  For example, Bernal Díaz del Castillo speaks of homosexuality among the ruling classes, prostitution of young people, and cross-dressing in the area of Veracruz.  The yauyos had prostitution houses full of men with painted faces and women's clothing.

The Toltecs, elsewhere, were extremely tolerant of homosexuality.

The colonial era

In 1511, Peter Martyr d'Anghiera published his De orbe novo decades, with the information that he was able to get about the first explorers thanks to his friendship with Isabella I of Castile.  D'Anghiera told how Vasco Núñez de Balboa, during his exploration of Quarequa, in the Isthmus of Panama, in 1513, upset with "a brother of the king and other young men, obliging men, [who] dressed effeminately with women's clothing [... of those which the brother of the king] went too far with unnatural" temerity, threw forty of them as food to the dogs.  D'Anghiera continues his story saying that the indigenous people's "natural hate for unnatural sin" drove them so that, "spontaneously and violently, they searched for all the rest that they would know who were infected".  After all, D'Anghiera mentions that "only the nobles and the gentlemen practiced that kind of desire.  [... The] indigenous people knew that sodomy gravely offended God.  [... And that these acts provoked] the tempests that with thunder and lightning so frequently afflicted them, or the floods that drowned their fruits that had caused hunger and sickness."

In an account on the indigenous people realized in 1519 for the council of the town of Veracruz to report to Charles I, attributed to Hernán Cortés, it is mentioned that they had "managed to know for certain that they are all sodomites and practice that abominable sin".  In another account from an anonymous Italian conquistador, it is said that the men and women of Pánuco worship a masculine member and have erect phalluses in their temples and public plazas to worship them: "the multitude of methods used by the men to satisfy their abominable vice [is] almost too unbelievable to be sure. [...] the devil contained in their idols has possessed them.  It has given them instructions to sacrifice their fellow men, to extract their hearts and to offer the hearts, as well as the blood taken from the tongue, the ears, the legs and the arms, all to the idols".  Finally, he comments that "all the inhabitants of New Spain and those of other adjacent provinces ate human flesh, all commonly practiced sodomy and drank to excess", comparing some of the customs of the indigenous people with those of the ungodly saracens.

In the middle of the 16th century the conquistador Bernal Díaz del Castillo and the soldier Juan de Grijalva write about scenes of sodomy carved into the architecture, in gold jewelry, in terracota and in statues. The West Indies explorer and gold smelting manager Gonzalo Fernández de Oviedo y Valdés included specifics in his 1526 La Natural hystoria de las Indias (his Sumario), expanded in his Historia general y natural de las Indias (1535, further expanded in 1851 from his previously unpublished papers).  Around the same time, Núñez Cabeza de Vaca writes:

Isabella of Portugal, wife of Charles V, possibly driven by these accounts, banned in 1529 the planting or use of maguey for the fermentation of pulque.  The queen thought that it caused "drunkenness and drove the Indians to carry out" human sacrifices and unspeakable sin.

These and other accounts were converted into an authentic literary genre, circulated to the whole Peninsula, and were used to justify the idea of Empire; it was another "just cause" for the domination and occupation of the West Indies.  Francisco de Vitoria, despite knowing that the indigenous people were right and that as such the emperor did not have law over them, thought that "the heathens that committed sins against nature, such as idolatry, pederasty or fornication, all those offenses to God, could have been stopped by force".  Among those sins against nature was naturally sodomy, the sin against nature par excellence.  The legislation was based on the different culture and its customs, among the most notable: cannibalism, human sacrifice, and sodomy, in this case the conquest of the Aztec Empire could have represented simply an extension of the Spanish reconquest of the infidels, represented then by the Moors.  Thus the circle was closed with the relationship of Moor, sodomite, Indian.

In reaction to these writings, as of 1542, Bartolomé de Las Casas, along with other indigenous and missionary writers, launched a literary counteroffensive. Las Casas considered the "beastly vice of sodomy as the worst, the most detestable of any human wickedness".  He denied with passion the reports passed on by the conquistadors and explorers, who had "defamed the Indians, having accused them of being infected with sodomy, a great and wicked falsehood" and thought that they observed "abstinence towards the sensual, vile and dirty affections", although he admitted that in a country so big there could be isolated cases of particular people in particular cases, attributed to "a natural corruption, depravity, a kind of innate sickness or fear of witchcraft and other magic spells", but in no case among the converts to Christianity. Las Cases gives for example the mixe who cruelly set fire to the sodomites discovered in the temple.  According to the statements of Friar Augustín de Vetancurt, those men who dressed as women (and vice versa) were hanged if they committed unspeakable sin and the priests were burned, a report that Friar Gerónimo de Mendieta confirms.  Friar Gregorio García, in his Origin of the Indians of the new world (sic, 1607), assured that before the arrival of the Spanish "the men of New Spain committed huge sins, especially those against nature, although repeatedly they burned for those and were consumed in the fire sent from the heavens [... the indigenous people] punished the sodomites with death, executed them with great vigor. [...] They strangled or drowned the women who lay with other women since those also considered it against nature".  Garcia attributed the cases of sodomy to the fact that the "miserable Indians act like that because the Devil has tricked them, making them believe that the gods they worship also practice sodomy and therefore they consider it a good and lawful custom".

Nevertheless, Las Casas could not stop giving news about homosexual acts in contemporary Indian societies, as the custom of the fathers buying young boys for their children "to be used for the pleasure of sodomy", the existence of "infamous public places known as efebías where lewd and shameless young men practiced the abominable sin with all those who came into the house" or the two-spirits, "impotent, effeminate men dressed as women and carrying out their work".  Also Friar Gregoria García gave news of that kind, such as "some men dressed as women and some father had five sons [... the younger] dressed him as a woman, and instructed him in his work and married him as a girl, although even in New Spain they scorned the effeminate and womanly Indians".  The mentions of sodomy continued for a long time, even in 1666, in Cristóbal de Agüero and in 1697, in Friar Ángel Serra.

Indigenous writers did not delay in joining Las Casas to defend American culture.  Fernando de Alva Cortés Ixtlilxochitl, governor of Texcoco, wrote in 1605 that among the Chichimecs, the one who "assumed the function of the woman had his internal parts extracted by the backside while he stayed tied up to a stake, after which some boys poured ashes on the body until it was buried under them [...] they covered all the pile with many pieces of firewood and set it on fire.  [... also] covered that which had functioned as man with ashes while he was alive, until he died".  Alva Ixtlilxochitl's account is, according to Crompton, too detailed to be invented, but according to Garza the story shows clear signs of Mediterranean influence in the fact of the differentiation between active and passive homosexuals.

The colonial administration imposed the Spanish laws and customs on the indigenous peoples, which, in the case of sodomy, was facilitated by the existence of similar laws in the Aztec Empire.  During the Spanish Golden Age, the crime of sodomy was handled and punished in equivalent manner to that of treason or heresy, the two most serious crimes against the State.  Initially the Inquisition was controlled by the local bishops, such as the archbishop Juan de Zumárraga (1536-1543), of whom a study of the cases judged shows that homosexuality was one of the main preoccupations of the court.  The punishments for sexual sins tended to be fines, penance, public humiliation, and lashing in the most serious cases.  In 1569 Felipe II officially creates the tribunal of Mexico City, but in the Viceroyalty of New Spain only civil law took charge of judging the unspeakable sin.

The first known burning of sodomites in Mexico was in 1530, when they burned on the Caltzontzin pyre for idolatry, sacrifice, and sodomy.  Pedro Cieza de León also tells that Juan of Olmos, principal judge of Puerto Viejo, had burned "great quantities of those depraved and demonic Indians".  In 1596, the viceroy Gaspar de Zúñiga, Count of Monterrey reported, in a letter sent to Philip II to justify the increase of the salary of the royal officials, that those had seized and burned some delinquents for the unspeakable sin and other types of sodomy, although he does not give the number of victims or the circumstances of the event.

In 1658 the Viceroy of New Spain, the Duke of Albuquerque, wrote to Philip IV about a case of unspeakable sin in Mexico City in which he had "nineteen prisoners, fourteen of which [were] sentenced to burn".  Lucas Matheo, a young man of 15 years, was saved from the bonfire thanks to his youth, but suffered 200 lashes and six years of forced labor by cannon.  Among the documents sent to the king is a letter from the judge of the Supreme Court of His Majesty, Juan Manuel Sotomayor, who describes sodomy as an "endemic cancer" that had "infested and spread among the captive prisoners of the Inquisition in their individual cells and the ecclesiastical officials have also begun their own investigations".  The letter from Sotomayor reports that between 1657 and 1658 they have investigated and sentenced 125 individuals, whose names, ethnicities, and occupations he lists next.  The Viceroy as much as the Magistrate bases his rejection of sodomy on the Bible and religion, although they use stories sui generis, like Sotomayor, who writes "as some saints have professed, that all the sodomites have died with the birth of Our Lord Jesus".

The previous case allows us to catch a glimpse of the subculture of homosexuals in Mexico City in the first half of the 17th century, since many of the accused were more than 60 years old and took that life for more than twenty.  All those involved came from the lower classes: blacks, indigenous people, mulattos, and deformed Europeans.  There are signs that the wealthier classes were also implicated, but were not deemed affected thanks to their influence.  Many of the accused had nicknames, like Juan de la Vega, who was called "la Cotita", Juan de Correa, "la Estanpa", or Miguel Gerónimo, "la Cangarriana", the nickname of a prostitute from the city who was known for her promiscuity.  The group met periodically in private houses, often on the days of religious festivities with the excuse of praying and giving tribute to the Virgin and the saints, but in reality they had cross-dressing dances and orgies.  The next meeting places and dates were mentioned in the previous parties or were disseminated by mail and messengers who belonged to the group.

Colonial culture was similar to that of Spain and had and had prominent intellectuals among those born in America.  Perhaps one of the most important was Sor Juana Inés de la Cruz, of whom it has also been said that she was a lesbian, based on the intense friendships that she had with various women, the beauty of whom she praises in her poetry.

Independent Mexico
In 1821 Mexico gained independence from Spain and began a new phase.  Some researchers have emphasized that cultural practices, such as friendship and homosociality of some groups of leaders, and clergy, the army, and lawyers, among others, facilitated the development of homoerotic practices. President Anastasio Bustamante, for example, used to have "young gentlemen" or "favorites" as hostesses, private secretaries, who lived and traveled with him for long periods.

In 1863 French troops took Mexico City and established Maximilian I as Emperor of Mexico.  Fernando Bruquetas de Castro, in his book "Kings who loved like queens", states that Maximilian I was gay.  It seems that the rumours of his homosexuality began in the court of Brussels, where his wife, the princess Carlota Amalia, came from.  The conclusive breakup between Maximilian and Carlota was during a stopover in Madeira, where the future emperor made a famous escape for the homosexual underworld of the island.  In Mexico, Carlota became pregnant, possibly by the baron Alfred van Der Smissen, who formed part of the queen's guard, while the emperor was surrounded by his male friends, like the prince Félix Salm-Salm or the colonel López, who were loyal to the end.

The French invasion introduced the Napoleonic code in Mexico.  The code does not mention sodomy, for it had ceased to be a crime.  Nevertheless, in 1871 the new Penal Code introduced "attack on morality and proper customs", a relatively vague concept whose interpretation was left to the police and the judges, and which was used against homosexuals.  Thus, in the late 19th century a homosexual subculture had already formed in Mexico City, similar to that existing in other large American cities such as Buenos Aires, Rio de Janeiro, Havana, New York City, and Toronto.  The work of historians like Victor M . Macías-González, Pablo Picatto, and Robert Buffington, among others, has identified areas such as gay bathhouses, prisons, and some squares and avenues of the capital. The work of criminologist Roumagnac, for example, gives details of homosexual practices in the country's prisons.

In the spring of 1918, Manuel Palafox, secretary general of Emiliano Zapata, was accused by political enemies within the Zapatista camp of having leaked information through his homosexual relationships.  Put under the watch of Gildardo Magaña, he escaped and sought to bring together the Zapatista leaders around him, in which he failed.  Palafox died in 1959 without revealing his homosexuality.

In the 1930s there already existed some bars and baths for homosexuals in Mexico City, in the areas around Alameda, Zócalo, Paseo de Reforma and Calle Madero.  In the next decade, during World War II, the city had ten to fifteen bars, and dancing was permitted in El África and El Triumfo.  This relative permissivity ended in 1959, when the mayor Uruchurtu closed all the city's gay bars after a triple crime.

The Dance of the Forty-One

The most famous scandal of the 19th and 20th centuries was known as the Dance of the Forty-One. The incident revolved around a raid executed on 18 November 1901, during Porfirio Díaz's term of office.  The raid, executed on Calle de la Paz (since renamed Calle Ezequiel Montes), was against a dance attended by 41 men, of which 22 were dressed as men and 19 as women.  The Mexican press fed on the event, despite the Governor's efforts to cover it up, since the participants belonged to the upper echelons of society.  The list of the detainees was never published.

A rumour, neither confirmed nor denied, soon emerged, claiming that there were in reality 42 participants, with the forty-second being Ignacio de la Torre, Porfirio Díaz's son-in-law, who was allowed to escape. Although the raid was illegal and completely arbitrary, the 41 were convicted and conscripted into the army and sent to Yucatán where the Caste War was still being fought:

On 4 December 1901 there was a similar raid on a group of lesbians in Santa María, but that incident received far less attention.

As a result of the scandal, the numbers 41 and 42 were adopted by Mexican popular parlance to refer to homosexuality, with 42 reserved for passive homosexuals.
The incident and the numbers were spread through press reports, but also through engravings, satires, plays, literature, and paintings; in recent years, they have even appeared on television, in the historical telenovela  El vuelo del águila, first broadcast by Televisa in 1994. In 1906 Eduardo A. Castrejón published a book titled Los cuarenta y uno. Novela crítico-social. José Guadalupe Posada's engravings alluding to the affair are famous, and were frequently published alongside satirical verses:

Such was the impact of the affair that the number 41 became taboo, as described by the essayist Francisco L. Urquizo:

The precedent from the Dance of the Forty-One has been used since that time to continue constant raids, police blackmail, torture, beatings, shipments to jail and to the prison of the Maria Islands, with a simple mention that it concerned an "attack on morality and proper customs".

Society in the twentieth century
Many homosexuals continued living in the family house, since their activities tended to be private or clandestine.  In the late twentieth century and early twenty-first century, homosexuals continue to be discreet about their sexual orientation, many being in the closet, others living an open secret.

The lower classes of Mexican society tend to preserve the Mediterranean model, in which homosexuals are divided into active and passive, the active ones being "masculine" and the passive ones being "effeminate" and "contemptible": "I'm a man; if I fuck you, you're not a man".  There exists fear among active homosexuals of being penetrated, because they fear the possibility that they will like it and cease to be "men".  For their part, the homosexuals of the higher, more cosmopolitan classes took the European model of the dandy in the late nineteenth century.  This model is being replaced by another more similar to the Anglo-Saxon one, in which the homosexual is not defined by the active/passive dichotomy, but by the fact that he has sexual relations with other men.  Those who refuse to define themselves as active or passive are called "internationals".

Among many Mexican homosexuals there exists the so-called "phallic dream", which consists of seeing the US as a sexual utopia, in which they can be free and openly gay.  Acting accordingly, they try to make contact with foreign tourists as a springboard to the dream destination.  However, as of 2007, many end up disillusioned in the dream destination when they have to face up to prevailing homophobia and racism.

LGBT movement
Until the late 1960s, there were neither LGBT groups nor publications on the topic.  The first LGBT groups were formed in the early 1970s in Mexico City and Guadalajara.  On 15 August 1971, the Homosexual Liberation Front was formed, the first of its kind in Mexico.  It was dissolved a year later.

One of the first LGBT activists was Nancy Cárdenas.  Cárdenas, writer, actress, and theater director, inspired by the LGBT movements in Europe and the United States, began to direct gatherings of LGBT writers.  In 1973 she was the first Mexican to openly discuss her homosexuality on Mexican television.  In 1974 she founded the Homosexual Liberation Front (FLH), the first LGBT organisation of Mexico.

On 26 July 1978, the first LGBT march took place, in favour of the Cuban Revolution.  The march was organised by the Homosexual Front for Revolutionary Action (FHAR).  On 2 October of the same year, the groups FLH, Lesbos, Oikabeth, Lambda of Homosexual Liberation, and Sex-Pol, among others, marched in the demonstration to commemorate the tenth anniversary of the movement of 1968.  In 1979, FHAR took to the streets again in favor of the Nicaraguan Revolution.  As can be appreciated, the LGBT movement was very connected to leftist movements in the beginning.  In late June 1979 the first demonstration in favor of homosexual rights took place, coinciding with the anniversary of the Stonewall riots.  Demonstrators demanded freedom of sexual expression, and protested social and police repression.  Since then, an LGBT march is celebrated annually on 28 June.  But these groups and others have not had the necessary continuity.

The LGBT movement found itself paradoxically driven by the AIDS crisis, which is believed to have reached Mexico in 1981.  LGBT groups were focused more on the fight against the infection, carrying out prevention and safe sex campaigns with information on the disease, but also led their fight against the social prejudices of the more conservative sectors, which considered AIDS a divine punishment.  The demonstrations, which had become annual, asked for the end of social discrimination against AIDS patients, especially in employment, hospitals and health centers, and prevention measures, such as the promotion of condom use.

In the 1990s, without ceasing to fight for the aforementioned issues, activists began to protest the murders of homosexuals, and to defend respect for sexual diversity.  In 1992, Patria Jiménez and Gloria Careaga Pérez created the lesbian organization "El clóset de Sor Juana" (Sister Juana's closet), one of the country's most important LGBT organizations.  It was accredited as an NGO by the United Nations for the Fourth World Conference on Women.

Activists in politics
In 1997, Patria Jiménez was the first openly gay person to win a position in Congress, doing so for the Party of the Democratic Revolution.  In 2007, Amaranta Gómez Regalado (for México Posible) was the first transgender person to appear in Congress.  Amaranta Gómez is identified with the muxe, a name given locally to the two-spirits of Juchitán de Zaragoza (Oaxaca).

Present

Homophobia
Homophobia is very widespread in Mexican society.  Between 2002 and 2007, 1000 people have been murdered in homophobic crimes, as the Chamber of Deputies revealed in May 2007, making Mexico the country with the second-highest rate of homophobic crimes in the world (after Brazil).  In a journalistic study by Fernando del Collado, titled Homofobia, odio, crimen y justicia (Homophobia, hate, crime and justice), there were discussed 400 dead between 1995 and 2005, that is to say, some 3 murders a month, but the City Commission Against Homophobic Hate Crimes calculates that only one in four crimes is reported.  From January to August 2009, 40 gay people were murdered in Michoacán alone, nearly all of them in the Tierra Caliente area.  The great majority are against gay men; from 1995 to 2004, "only" 16 women had been murdered.  The crimes are often ignored or investigated with little interest by the police forces, who give impunity to the criminal in 98% of cases.  Other forms of less serious violence are classified into the following types, according to a 2007 study by the Metropolitan Autonomous University (UAM) Xochimilco campus: verbal violence in 32% of cases, sexual harassment in 18%, harassment in 12%, following or pursuit in 12%, and threats in 11%.  According to the UAM study, the most frequent types of discrimination "were not hiring for a job, 13 percent; threats of extortion and detention by police, 11 percent; and abuse of employees, 10 percent".

Some 71% of Mexican youth would not approve if the same rights were given to homosexuals as heterosexuals.  A 2006 survey states that 33% of Mexicans feel aversion for homosexuals, some 40% don't like politicians who emphasize homosexuality, and some 32% don't like homosexual neighbors.  Homophobia is also deeply rooted in the family.  In 2004 only 4 families of those murdered in homophobic crimes, of a total of 26, offered to give information on the matter to a commission that was investigation.  In Mexico City, in 2004, of 125 corpses of homosexuals, only 75 were claimed by their relatives; for 13 others, the family came only to the identification; the family of the rest did not approach the funeral home, despite having been informed.  There exist signs that Mexican youth are being committed to psychiatric clinics after coming out to family.  Some 16% have been rejected by family, and a greater percentage have been physically attacked by relatives.

Popular culture encourages this attitude.  The rock group Molotov published in 1997, on their album ¿Dónde Jugarán las Niñas?, the song "Puto".  The lyrics of the song contain phrases like "Marica nena mas bien putín, Puto nace, puto se muere, Amo a matón / matarile al maricón / ¿¡y que quiere este hijo de puta!? / quiere llorar, Puto, le faltan tanates al / ¡puto! / le falta topiates / ¡puto! / le faltan tanates al puto puto".  The producer, Gustavo Santaolalla, in some statements to the magazine Retila, stated that the word "puto" had not been used in the sense of "gay", but in the sense of "coward" or "loser", which is also used in Mexico.

The Catholic Church has also contributed to a negative view of homosexuals. In 2010, Jose Guadalupe Martin, Bishop of León, Guanajuato and president of the Mexican bishops' conference from 2004 to 2006, five days after the earthquake in Chile, suggested that homosexuals (along with drug violence) are guilty of natural disasters, incurring the wrath of God for gay marriage.

The consequences for the LGBT community are shown in the UAM study, which states that 27% of LGBT persons studied suffer mental disorders and risk of alcoholism, some 40% have thoughts of suicide and 25% have attempted it.

LGBT rights

The LGBT community has been gaining some rights in the first years of the 21st century.  On 29 April 2003, the Federal Law to Prevent and Eliminate Discrimination was passed.  The law, which has been criticized as insufficient, gives rise to the creation of the National Council to Prevent Discrimination (Consejo Nacional para Prevenir la Discriminación, CONAPRED), which is in charge of receiving and settling cases of discrimination, as well as "develop[ing] actions to protect all citizens from every distinction or exclusion based on ethnic or national origin, sex, age, disability, social or economic condition, conditions of health, pregnancy, language, religion, beliefs, sexual preferences, marital status or any other, that prevents or annuls the acknowledgement or the exercise of the rights and the real equality of opportunities of persons".

In November 2006, the Law for Coexistence Partnerships was enacted in the Federal District.  Called "gay law" in the mass  media, this legal arrangement is not orientated exclusively to the homosexual population.  The law - in effect since its publication in the official newspaper of the capital city government on 16 March 2007 - gives almost the same rights as a married couple within the limits of the Federal District, with the exception of adoption.  The first Mexican state to legalize civil unions was Coahuila on 11 January 2007, under the name of "civil solidarity agreement".  The Coahuilan congress modified the civil code to introduce the new form of cohabitation.  The law allows similar rights to marriage, but prohibits adoption by same-sex couples.  On 4 March 2010, Mexico City's law allowing same-sex marriage took effect, despite an appeal by the Attorney-General of the Republic, making Mexico the first Latin American country to allow same-sex marriage by non-judicial means.  On 12 March 2010 Mexico City held its first same-sex wedding, which will be recognized throughout the Mexican territory.

In spite of these advances, in 2006, the Mexican population was primarily against same-sex marriage.  In a survey by Parametría, 61% of those surveyed responded "no" when asked if they supported an amendment to the constitution to legalize gay marriage.  Only some 17% responded affirmatively and some 14% did not give an opinion.  In the same survey, some 41% were against the possibility of giving the same rights enjoyed by a married couple to a registered same-sex couple, only 28% supporting this possibility.

The pink peso

The pink market (called "LGBT market" or "mercado rosa") in Mexico is calculated at 51,300 million pesos (some $4,663 million).  The group of LGBT consumers, ignored until the present out of homophobia or fear of critics, is being discovered.  In 2005 the Gay Expo in Mexico was created, which claimed to give to know the companies and services to the LGBT community, and the companies of the division have been united into the Union of Companies and Service Providers to the Lesbian, Gay, Bisexual and Transgender Community (Unegay).

A study by the agency De la Riva on the behavior of the LGBT consumer shows that the habits of gay men and lesbians are distinct.  While gay men prefer brand names and a riskier lifestyle, lesbians tend to be educated and don't tend to pay attention to brand names.  Gays respond to advertisements that make knowing winks to the community, but reject advertisements with openly gay themes, because they fear being identified through the product.  Gay men as much as lesbians have great emotional needs and need to be accepted, and prefer stable partners.

Pink tourism, especially from the U.S., has one of its favorite destinations in Mexico and specially Puerto Vallarta, where it is even possible to see men taking a walk hand in hand in the Zona Romántica.  Another favorite destination is Cancun, which has tried to attract the LGBT public with events like the Cancún Mayan Riviera Gay Fall Fiesta and the Cancún International Gay Festival.  LGBT tourism does not focus just on sun and beaches and Mayan ruins, but is diversifying.  For this public there exist two specialised travel agencies, Opta Tours (since 1991) and Babylon Tours.

LGBT culture

Frida Kahlo, one of Mexico's greatest artists, was bisexual.  However, her lesbian relationships were of little importance and were diminished by the love of her life, Diego Rivera.  Her importance for the LGBT community is not so much due to her bisexuality as to her having been converted into a gay icon, due to her fighter and non-conformist nature.  Other LGBT painters and visual artists are Roberto Montenegro, Nahum B. Zenil, Julio Galán, Roberto Márquez, and Carla Rippey.

Mexican LGBT author Luis Zapata Quiroz has been criticized for perpetuating the stereotypes of the American pattern of the tragic gay man, although he never portrays homosexuality negatively.  Carlos Monsiváis also has considered in his critique the profound homoeroticism of the poets belonging to the group Los Contemporáneos between the late 1920s and mid 1940s.  Several of his poets, such as Xavier Villaurrutia, Carlos Pellicer, and Salvador Novo, were gay and "let themselves be touched, discreetly, by a theme very dear to the age: the sailors, in the aura of the night port, with their liberty and their beauty".  The Chicano LGBT community has also created a thriving culture.  Thus, Gloria E. Anzaldúa and Cherríe Moraga are two important authors within the North American LGBT community, and Francisco X. Alarcón, professor at the University of California, has published nine books of poetry.

Within music there is to mention Chavela Vargas (born in Costa Rica and living in Mexico for decades), whose lyrics contain clear lesbian elements, and Juan Gabriel, one of the most important composers of popular music in Mexico.  One of the few singers who has come out of the closet has been Christian Chávez, singer for the group RBD.  The singer and actor found himself driven to that after photos were circulating on the Internet of his wedding in Canada in 2005.

One of the gay centers of culture and amusement in Mexico is the Zona Rosa, a series of streets in Colonia Juárez in Mexico City.  Since mid-2007, the government of the Federal District and Cuauhtémoc, D.F.—in whose territory the Zona Rosa is found—have placed operatives in some seedy nightclubs of the Zona Rosa, with the purpose of freeing this tourist zone of problems such as illegal drug trade and prostitution, as well as reducing the incidence of crimes such as theft.  Other targets of the program are those sites of cohabitation that lack safety measures for the users—mainly emergency exits.  LGBT groups have denounced the action as a form of homophobia.

Film
Homosexuality in Mexican film appears depicted in two manners.  On one hand, from the 1970s to 1990s, the period after the so-called golden age of film in the country, numerous films incorporated characters with homosexual orientations.  It was almost always about male characters who tended to reproduce the stereotypes of popular culture about homosexuals: effeminate men with eccentric clothing and rather eccentric ways of speaking.  Homosexuals appear often as secondary characters, almost always executing secondary roles and the butt of jokes on the part of the rest of the characters.  An example is the film Fin de la fiesta (1972), in which Doña Beatriz, the mother (played by Sara García), kills her gay son with sticks.

One of the first Mexican films in which the main character is gay was El lugar sin límites (1977), directed by Arturo Ripstein and based on the novel by Chilean José Donoso.  The plot revolves around a countrified brothel on the seashore where La Manuela (a transvestite played by Roberto Cobo) and his daughter La Japonesita (Ana Martín) practice prostitution.

Homosexuality appears very differently in the work of the director Jaime Humberto Hermosillo.  His films were not widely distributed or were never displayed in public; perhaps the best known is the gay-themed Doña Herlinda y su hijo (1984).

Films like Danzón (1991), by María Novaro; Miroslava (1993), by Alejandro Pelayo; El callejón de los milagros (1995), by Jorge Fons; or Y tu mamá también, by Alfonso Cuarón incorporate homoerotic subject matter as a secondary matter in their plots or in a hidden way.  The 2003 film A Thousand Clouds of Peace, directed by Julián Hernández, received the Teddy Award at the Berlin International Film Festival.  None of the film's characters approached the homosexual stereotypes that appeared in Mexican film for decades.  In 2006, the same director shot another film with gay characters, Broken Sky, which chronicles the tensions in a young couple because of infidelity.

Further reading
Bliss, Katherine Elaine. "The Sexual Revolution in Mexican Studies: New Perspectives on Gender, Sexuality, and Culture in Modern Mexico." Latin American Research Review vol. 35 no. 1, pp. 247–268.
Carrier, James. De los Otros: Intimacy and Homosexuality among Mexican Men. New York: Columbia University Press 1995.

Gutmann, Matthew C. The Meanings of Macho: Being a Man in Mexico City. Berkeley and Los Angeles: University of California Press 1996.

Prieur, Annick. Mema's House, Mexico City: On Machos, Queens, and Transvestites. Chicago: University of Chicago Press 1998.
Quinones, Sam. "The Jotos of La Fogata" chapter 4 in True Tales of Another Mexico. Albuquerque: University of New Mexico Press 2001.
Sigal, Pete. The Flower and the Scorpion: Sexuality and Ritual in Early Nahua Culture. Durham: Duke University Press 2011.

References

External links
 "Historia" in XII Marcha de la diversidad Gdl 2008 
 "México" in the encyclopedia lgbtq
 "México" in Global Gayz.com
 Chronology of Mexican gay history

LGBT in Mexico